Lily Live! is a flamboyant live/scripted comedy show which was produced by LWT and was broadcast for two series on ITV in 2000 and 2001, presented by Paul O'Grady (as Lily Savage).

The show guest-starred the club act Gayle Tuesday, played by Brenda Gilhooly, and the actress Jayne Tunnicliffe as Mary Unfaithful.

Transmissions

Series

Special

Guests and songs

Series One Episode One (2 September 2000)
Lily's guests tonight were Gayle Tuesday, Mary Unfaithful, Madison Avenue, Michael Starke (actor) and Joanne Campbell. Matt Zinnerman was the Voice Over. Lily opened the show with All of Me and then later sung The Wonder of You as a duet with Michael Starke (actor).

Series One Episode Two (9 September 2000)
Lily's guests tonight were Gayle Tuesday, Madeline Bell, Mel B and Mary Unfaithful. Brad Lavelle was the Voice Over. Lily opened the show with Let Me Entertain You and sung The Man I Love with Madeline Bell as a duet.

Series One Episode Three (16 September 2000)
The guests on tonight's show were Gayle Tuesday, Liz Dawn, The Beautiful South, and Mary Unfaithful. Lily opened the show with Don't Tell Mama. Then later sung I Can't Give You Anything But Love as a duet with Liz Dawn.

Series One Episode Four (23 September 2000)
Lily's guests tonight were Gayle Tuesday, Crystal Gayle, Martine McCutcheon and Mary Unfaithful. Matt Zinnerman was the Voice Over. Lily opened the show with Saved.

Series One Episode Five (30 September 2000)
Gayle Tuesday, Sue Jenkins, Martin Kemp, Mary Unfaithful and Texas were tonight's guests. Brad Lavelle was the Voice Over. Alongside Sue Jenkins, Lily sung Ta-Ra-Ra-Boom-De-Ay as a duet. Lily closed the show with That's My Boy.

Series One Episode Six (7 October 2000)
For the last show in the present series, Lily's guests were Gayle Tuesday, Richard and Judy, Jackie Collins, Gray O'Brien and Mary Unfaithful. Lily opened the show with I'll Make A Man of You. Then later sung You're The Top as a duet with Gray O'Brien. Lily closed the show with Non Je Ne Regrette Rien.

External links
 BFI.org
 https://www.imdb.com/title/tt0260630/

2000s British comedy television series
2000 British television series debuts
2001 British television series endings
ITV sketch shows
English-language television shows
ITV (TV network) original programming
Television series by ITV Studios
London Weekend Television shows
Paul O'Grady